Nathan "Nate" Riech (born 5 February 1995) is a Canadian Paralympic athlete who competes in middle-distance running events in international level events. He has a dual citizenship with Canada and the United States.

Personal life
Riech was born in a sporting family: his father Todd Riech competed for United States at the 1996 Summer Olympics in the men's javelin throw, his mother Ardin Tucker was a Canadian pole vaulter who competed in the 2002 Commonwealth Games. His grandfather, Jim Harrison, played in the National Hockey League with the Toronto Maple Leafs, Chicago Blackhawks and Boston Bruins. Riech's cousin Georganne Moline competed in the 400 metre hurdles in the 2012 Summer Olympics and 2016 Summer Olympics while his stepmother Brittany Borman also competed in the same Olympics in the women's javelin throw.

Riech's disability occurred after a freak accident aged ten while he was playing golf with friends, a golf ball hit Riech in the back of the head which caused him to have a brain injury which affected the right side of his body.

Sporting career
Riech began running at ten years old in Chandler, Arizona. He went on to run NCAA track at Furman University and University of South Alabama. He began competing internationally in 2018 in the World Para Athletics Grand Prix in Berlin where he broke the 800 metres and 1500 metres T38 world records, one year later, he broke then 1500 metre world record again. He won his first medal in the 2019 Parapan American Games in Lima.

References

External links
 
 

1995 births
Living people
Sportspeople from Fresno, California
Paralympic track and field athletes of Canada
Canadian male middle-distance runners
World Para Athletics Championships winners
Medalists at the 2019 Parapan American Games
Athletes (track and field) at the 2020 Summer Paralympics
Medalists at the 2020 Summer Paralympics
Paralympic gold medalists for Canada
Paralympic medalists in athletics (track and field)